Bruri  is a mountain in Lesja Municipality in Innlandet county, Norway. There are two small glaciers on the west side of Bruri.

See also
List of mountains of Norway

References

Lesja
Mountains of Innlandet